This is the discography of the Grammy-winning banjoist Béla Fleck which consists of 24 studio albums (14 solo, two wth Tasty Licks, three with Spectrum, two with Sparrow Quartet, three with Abigail Washburn), 12 collaboration albums, one live album, three music videos, 12 singles (eight as lead artist and three as featured artist).

Albums

Studio albums

Solo albums

With Béla Fleck and the Flecktones

With The New Grass Revival

With Tasty Licks

With Spectrum

With Sparrow Quartet

With Abigail Washburn

Collaborations

Live albums

Compilation albums

Singles

As lead artist

As featured artist

Music videos

Production and songwriting
These are writing and production credits for music outside of Béla Fleck's own solo work, Béla Fleck and the Flecktones, with Abigail Washburn, and others listed.

Other appearances

Footnotes

References

External links
Official website

Discographies of American artists
Folk music discographies
Jazz discographies
Country music discographies